Independent University of Business and Public Administration in Warsaw, abbreviated in Polish PWSBiA,  is a private university in Poland.

Senior staff
Founder of the university, Tadeusz Kozluk is the rector.

Fields of study

Law
Administration
Administration with a specialization in Diplomacy
Computer Science
Economics

In Law possible specializations are 
Economic law
Civil law
Criminal Law
Public international law
Comparative constitutional law

In Administration specializations are
Engineering for sustainable development of environmental protection
State fiscal policy and tax law
Local government in Poland and the EU
State and local authorities on the problems of health, security and public order
of bodies of state administration and local emergency and crisis
Sociology of work and social policy

In Diplomacy specializations are 
International organizations and institutions
Right to diplomatic and consular diplomacy, bilateral, treaties and international negotiations
Diplomacy, international organizations and non-governmental organizations
Contemporary threats to peace and security worldwide

In Economics specializations are
Intermediation and real estate valuation in the EU
Economics of tourist companies, hotel and sports
Banking, credit, liquidity risk and capital
Penetration of foreign markets in a globalizing world
Business journalism
Sociology of work and social policy

In Computer Science specializations are
Computer automation and robotics
Computer systems security engineering
Software manufacturing techniques
Multimedia techniques
Programming and management of web-based applications

In 2006, the only non-public school in Warsaw PWSBiA opened a new specialization in the area of computing: Computer Automation and Robotics. The task of this course is to train graduates combining specialist skills in the field of computer technology and a specialist in the field of modern automation.

Campus

The campus occupies three hectares in Warsaw. The campus buildings have a total area of 66 000 m. 
The university is located at ul. Bobrowiecka 9, in Warsaw.

Universities and colleges in Warsaw